Nadezhdin is a rural locality (a khutor) in Kommunarovskoye Rural Settlement, Leninsky District, Volgograd Oblast, Russia. The population was 61 as of 2010. There are 3 streets.

Geography 
Nadezhdin is located in steppe, 74 km north of Leninsk (the district's administrative centre) by road. Kommunar is the nearest rural locality.

References 

Rural localities in Leninsky District, Volgograd Oblast